Margem is a civil parish in the municipality of Gavião, Portugal. The population in 2011 was 811, in an area of 56.85 km2.

References

Freguesias of Gavião, Portugal